Deanna Oliver (born September 27, 1952) is an American actress and writer. She hails from Spokane, Washington. Oliver performed the voice of Toaster in the film The Brave Little Toaster (1987) and its sequels. In addition, she was a writer of the animated series Animaniacs (1993) and Tiny Toon Adventures (1990). Sherri Stoner worked with her for Universal's fantasy comedy Casper (1995) and Disney's My Favorite Martian (1999).

In 2010, she made an appearance at California State University, Northridge, with director Jerry Rees to discuss the making of their film, The Brave Little Toaster. She has a son, who according to Oliver, was deployed to serve in Afghanistan some months before the interview. At the deployment ceremony, some of the soldiers who were fans of the film had brought their toasters with them for her to autograph.

In addition to writing for animation, she currently teaches and directs main-stage shows at The Groundlings Theater in Hollywood.

See also 
 Aftershock (1990)

References

External links 
 

1952 births
Living people
20th-century American actresses
American voice actresses
American women screenwriters
21st-century American women